The 1989 season was São Paulo's 60th season since club's existence.

Statistics

Scorers

Managers performance

Overall

{|class="wikitable"
|-
|Games played || 52 (29 Campeonato Paulista, 19 Campeonato Brasileiro, 4 Friendly match)
|-
|Games won || 23 (14 Campeonato Paulista, 7 Campeonato Brasileiro, 2 Friendly match)
|-
|Games drawn || 22 (11 Campeonato Paulista, 9 Campeonato Brasileiro, 2 Friendly match)
|-
|Games lost || 7 (4 Campeonato Paulista, 3 Campeonato Brasileiro, 0 Friendly match)
|-
|Goals scored || 67
|-
|Goals conceded || 34
|-
|Goal difference || +33
|-
|Best result || 4–0 (A) v Juventus - Campeonato Paulista - 1989.04.19
|-
|Worst result || 1–4 (A) v Atlético Mineiro - Campeonato Brasileiro - 1989.09.20
|-
|Top scorer || Mário Tilico (12)
|-

Friendlies

Matches played with the B team

Torneo Hexagonal de Guadalajara

Official competitions

Campeonato Paulista

Matches

Second stage

Semifinals

Finals

Record

Campeonato Brasileiro

First stage

Matches

Second stage

Matches

Final

Record

External links
official website

References

Sao Paulo
São Paulo FC seasons